Elaine Taylor may refer to:

 Elaine Taylor (politician) (born 1967), Canadian politician in the Yukon Legislative Assembly
 Elaine Taylor (actress) (born 1943), English-born actress